Bounoura is a town and commune and capital of Bounoura District in Ghardaïa Province, Algeria. According to the 2008 census it has a population of 35,405, up from 27,775 in 1998, with an annual growth rate of 2.5%. It is effectively a suburb of the provincial capital Ghardaïa.

Geography

Bounoura lies on the banks of the Wadi Mzab, an intermittent river in the M'zab valley, just downstream upstream of Ghardaïa. The area has been listed as a UNESCO World Heritage Site.

Transportation

Bounoura is located on the N1 highway, part of the Trans-Sahara Highway, which leads north to Laghouat and south to El Goléa, In Salah and Tamanrasset.

Education

7.0% of the population has a tertiary education, and another 16.0% has completed secondary education. The overall literacy rate is 86.3%, and is 95.3% among males (joint highest in the province) and 77.2% among females.

Localities
The commune of Bounoura is composed of five localities:

Vieux Ksar de Bounane
Beni Izguen à partir du nouveau lycée et nouveau C.E.M.
Quartier Sidi Abbaz
Palmeraies de Bounoura
Beni Isguen

References

Neighbouring towns and cities

Communes of Ghardaïa Province